Rostislav Vergun (born Chernihiv 26 March 1982) is a Belarusian professional basketball coach and former player. He is the head coach of Tsmoki Minsk and the Belarus national team.

Career
He studied at the American University of Birmingham-Southern as accountancy.

After that he went to Belarus and from 2004 until 2008, he played for the Mogilev's Borisfen. From 2008 to 2012, he played for the club Minsk-2006, He played in the Non-Professional Basketball League of Belarus for BIT (2015) and Vitalyur (2015–2016), became the NBL champion (2015/2016), bronze medalist (2014/2015).

Coaching career
He finished his playing career in 2012, but in the 2013/2014 season, as the head coach of Mogilev's Borisfen, he was forced to enter the field as a player due to funding problems.

In August 2014, he was appointed assistant head coach of the club Tsmoki Minsk, and in 2015 was appointed as co-trainer.

In 2017, he was appointed as head coach of the reserve team BC Tsmoki-Minsk II, that won the Belarusian Premier League in 2017–18.

In January 2019, Vergun was appointed head coach of the Tsmoki Minsk club. In December 2019, Vergun was appointed head coach of the Belarus national team. In July 2020, Vergun extended his contract with Tsmoki Minsk.

Honours

As a player
BC Tsmoki-Minsk
Belarusian Premier League (4) 2008–09, 2009–10, 2010–11, 2011–12

As a Coach
BC Tsmoki-Minsk
Belarusian Premier League (4) 2018–19, 2019–20, 2020–21, 2021–22

References

External links
 Profile from Realgm.com
 Profile from BC Tsmoki-Minsk Website
 Profile from eurobasket.com

1956 births
Living people
BC Tsmoki-Minsk players
BC Tsmoki-Minsk coaches
Belarusian basketball players
Belarusian men's basketball players
Belarusian basketball coaches
Belarusian sports coaches
Belarusian sportsmen
Birmingham–Southern College alumni
Birmingham–Southern Panthers men's basketball players
Sportspeople from Chernihiv